The s (Devanagari:आन्ध्रभृत्य) was an Indian dynasty mentioned in the Puranas. Lists of Andhrabhrtyas have been mentioned in various Puranas. They are mostly identified with Satavahanas which replaced the house of the Maurya in the Deccan about 230 BC, reigning until the end of 3rd century AD. At the height of its power the dynasty succeeded in extending it reign far to the north, possibly right up to the Magadha. The term Andhrabhrtya has been used very ambiguously by some historians, sometimes it is used to mean the Satavahanas and sometimes  it is used to mean their feudatories. Yet again certain historians claim that the Chutus, who were Nagas, the younger branch of the Imperial Andhras were called Andhrabhrtya.

Sir R. G. Bhandarkar following the Vishnu Purana styles the dynasty founded by Simuka as Andhrabhrtya, i.e. Andhras who were once servants. But that designation is also applied to the seven s who are mentioned as the successors of the line of the Simuka.

References

See also
Hāla

States and territories established in the 3rd century BC
230s BC establishments
220 disestablishments
Empires and kingdoms of India
Satavahana dynasty
Telugu people
History of Andhra Pradesh
History of Telangana